Guangxi Clique may refer to:

 Old Guangxi clique, a clique of Chinese warlords by Lu Rongting up to the early 1920s
 New Guangxi clique, a clique of Chinese warlords led by Li Zongren from the mid 1920s
 Guangxi Army of the Qing dynasty